Anthony Martin (born 22 March 1985) is an Australian water polo player who competed in the 2008 Summer Olympics.

References

External links
 

1985 births
Living people
Australian male water polo players
Olympic water polo players of Australia
Water polo players at the 2008 Summer Olympics